Lake Marian is an alpine lake at the southern end of the Darran Mountains in the Fiordland National Park in the South Island of New Zealand. The lake is located just above the treeline in a hanging valley leading northwest from the Hollyford Valley near The Divide pass.

The lake is fed and drained by Marian Creek which in turn feeds into the Hollyford River / Whakatipu Kā Tuka. Marian Creek's catchment upstream of Lake Marian includes several permanent snowfields in a cirque at the head of the valley northeast of the peak of Mount Crosscut.

A 3-hour return tramping track leads to the lake from a car park along the Hollyford Road, only 1 kilometre in from the Milford Road (SH94). The track starts by crossing the Hollyford River on a swing bridge before leading upstream alongside Marian Creek as it cascades over a series of small waterfalls. After this, the track becomes rougher and can be muddy in places, with the climb up to Lake Marian  strenuous as it ascends almost  in height.

A good view of Lake Marian as it sits in the hanging valley between the peaks of Mt Christina, Mount Crosscut, and Mt Gunn can also be glimpsed from Key Summit on the opposite side of the Hollyford Valley on a short side track from the Routeburn Track.

References

Lakes of Fiordland